Samar Padak (Bengali: সমর পদক), is a military medal of Bangladesh. The medal is intended to be awarded to members of the armed forces participating in the war of liberation against Pakistan.

References 

Military awards and decorations of Bangladesh